The 2018 NBA Draft was held on June 21, 2018, at Barclays Center in Brooklyn, New York. National Basketball Association (NBA) teams took turns selecting amateur United States college basketball players and other eligible players, including international players. It was televised nationally by ESPN. State Farm was the presenting sponsor of the NBA draft for the seventh consecutive year. This draft was the last to use the original weighted lottery system that gave teams near the bottom of the NBA draft better odds at the top three picks of the draft while teams higher up had worse odds in the process; the rule was agreed upon by the NBA on September 28, 2017, but would not be implemented until the 2019 draft. It was also considered the final year where undrafted college underclassmen were forced to begin their professional careers early; on August 8, 2018, the NCAA announced that players who declared for the NBA draft and were not selected would have the opportunity to return to their school for at least another year. With the last year of what was, at the time, the most recent lottery system (with the NBA draft lottery being held in Chicago instead of in New York), the Phoenix Suns won the first overall pick on May 15, 2018, with the Sacramento Kings at the second overall pick and the Atlanta Hawks at third overall pick. The Suns' selection was their first No. 1 overall selection in franchise history. They used the selection on the Bahamian center Deandre Ayton from the nearby University of Arizona.

This draft was also notable for its lack of draft-day trades involving NBA veterans. An average of more than five veterans per year were traded on the day of the last three drafts, but this draft was the first since 2003 in which no such trades were announced. At the end of the 2018–19 season the top 5 picks from the draft were picked as the All-Rookie 1st Team, the first time this had happened since the 1984 draft.

Draft selections

{|class="wikitable sortable plainrowheaders" style="text-align:left"
|-
!scope="col" style="width:20px;"| 
!scope="col" style="width:20px;"| 
!scope="col" style="width:120px;"| Player
!scope="col" style="width:20px;"| 
!scope="col" style="width:100px;"| 
!scope="col" style="width:300px;"| Team
!scope="col" style="width:150px;"| 
|-
|style="text-align:center;"|1
|style="text-align:center;"|1
|
|C
|
|Phoenix Suns
|Arizona (Fr.)
|-
|style="text-align:center;"|1
|style="text-align:center;"|2
|
|PF
|
|Sacramento Kings
|Duke (Fr.)
|-
|style="text-align:center;"|1
|style="text-align:center;"|3
|bgcolor="#FBCEB1"|
*~
|PG
|
|Atlanta Hawks (traded to Dallas)
|Real Madrid (Spain)
|-
|style="text-align:center;"|1
|style="text-align:center;"|4
|bgcolor="FFCC00"|
+
|PF
|
|Memphis Grizzlies
|Michigan State (Fr.)
|-
|style="text-align:center;"|1
|style="text-align:center;"|5
|bgcolor="#FBCEB1"|
*
|PG
|
|Dallas Mavericks (traded to Atlanta)
|Oklahoma (Fr.)
|-
|style="text-align:center;"|1 
|style="text-align:center;"|6
|
|C
|
|Orlando Magic
|Texas (Fr.)
|-
|style="text-align:center;"|1
|style="text-align:center;"|7
|
|C
|
|Chicago Bulls
|Duke (Fr.)
|-
|style="text-align:center;"|1
|style="text-align:center;"|8
|
|SG/PG
|
|Cleveland Cavaliers (from Brooklyn via Boston)
|Alabama (Fr.)
|-
|style="text-align:center;"|1
|style="text-align:center;"|9
|
|SF
|
|New York Knicks
|Kentucky (Fr.)
|-
|style="text-align:center;"|1
|style="text-align:center;"|10
|
|SF
|
|Philadelphia 76ers (from L.A. Lakers via Phoenix; traded to Phoenix)
|Villanova (Jr.)
|-
|style="text-align:center;"|1
|style="text-align:center;"|11
|bgcolor="FFCC00"|
+
|SG/PG
|
|Charlotte Hornets (traded to the L.A. Clippers)
|Kentucky (Fr.)
|-
|style="text-align:center;"|1
|style="text-align:center;"|12
|
|SF
|
|Los Angeles Clippers (from Detroit, traded to Charlotte)
|Michigan State (So.)
|-
|style="text-align:center;"|1
|style="text-align:center;"|13
|
|SG
|
|Los Angeles Clippers
|Boston College (Jr.)
|-
|style="text-align:center;"|1
|style="text-align:center;"|14
|
|SF
|
|Denver Nuggets
|Missouri (Fr.)
|-
|style="text-align:center;"|1
|style="text-align:center;"|15
|
|SF
|
|Washington Wizards
|Oregon (Fr.)
|-
|style="text-align:center;"|1
|style="text-align:center;"|16
|
|SG
|
|Phoenix Suns (from Miami; traded to Philadelphia)
|Texas Tech (Fr.)
|-
|style="text-align:center;"|1
|style="text-align:center;"|17
|
|SG
|
|Milwaukee Bucks
|Villanova (So.)
|-
|style="text-align:center;"|1
|style="text-align:center;"|18
|
|SG
|
|San Antonio Spurs
|Miami (Fr.)
|-
|style="text-align:center;"|1
|style="text-align:center;"|19
|
|SG
|
|Atlanta Hawks (from Minnesota)
|Maryland (So.)
|-
|style="text-align:center;"|1
|style="text-align:center;"|20
|
|SG
|
|Minnesota Timberwolves (from Oklahoma City via Utah)
|Georgia Tech (So.)
|-
|style="text-align:center;"|1
|style="text-align:center;"|21
|
|SG
|
|Utah Jazz
|Duke (Sr.)
|-
|style="text-align:center;"|1
|style="text-align:center;"|22
|
|SF/SG
|
|Chicago Bulls (from New Orleans)
|Boise State (Sr.)
|-
|style="text-align:center;"|1
|style="text-align:center;"|23
|
|PG
|
|Indiana Pacers
|UCLA (Jr.)
|-
|style="text-align:center;"|1
|style="text-align:center;"|24
|
|SG
|
|Portland Trail Blazers
|IMG Academy (Bradenton, Florida; HSPg.)
|-
|style="text-align:center;"|1
|style="text-align:center;"|25
|
|PF
|
|Los Angeles Lakers (from Cleveland via Portland and Cleveland)
|Michigan (Jr.)
|-
|style="text-align:center;"|1
|style="text-align:center;"|26
|
|SG
|
|Philadelphia 76ers
|Wichita State (So.)
|-
|style="text-align:center;"|1
|style="text-align:center;"|27
|
|PF/C
|
|Boston Celtics
|Texas A&M (So.)
|-
|style="text-align:center;"|1
|style="text-align:center;"|28
|
|SG
|
|Golden State Warriors
|Cincinnati (Jr.)
|-
|style="text-align:center;"|1
|style="text-align:center;"|29
|
|SF
|
|Brooklyn Nets (from Toronto)
|Cedevita Zagreb (Croatia)
|-
|style="text-align:center;"|1
|style="text-align:center;"|30
|
|PF
|
|Atlanta Hawks (from Houston via L.A. Clippers)
|Villanova (Fr.)
|-
|style="text-align:center;"|2
|style="text-align:center;"|31
|
|PG
|
|Phoenix Suns
|Pau-Lacq-Orthez (France)
|-
|style="text-align:center;"|2
|style="text-align:center;"|32
|
|PG
|
|Memphis Grizzlies
|West Virginia (Sr.)
|-
|style="text-align:center;"|2
|style="text-align:center;"|33
|
|PG
|
|Dallas Mavericks
|Villanova (Jr.)
|-
|style="text-align:center;"|2
|style="text-align:center;"|34
|
|PG
|
|Atlanta Hawks  (traded to Charlotte) 
|Kansas (Sr.)
|-
|style="text-align:center;"|2
|style="text-align:center;"|35
|
|SF
|
|Orlando Magic
|Tulane (Jr.)
|-
|style="text-align:center;"|2
|style="text-align:center;"|36
|
|C
|
|New York Knicks (from Chicago via Oklahoma City)
|Chalmette HS (Chalmette, Louisiana; HS Sr.)
|-
|style="text-align:center;"|2
|style="text-align:center;"|37
|
|SG
|
|Sacramento Kings (traded to Portland)
|Duke (Fr.)
|-
|style="text-align:center;"|2
|style="text-align:center;"|38
|
|SG
|
|Philadelphia 76ers <small>(from Brooklyn, traded to Detroit){{refn|group=lower-alpha|name=38th|June 21, 2018: Philadelphia 76ers to Detroit Pistons
Detroit acquired Philadelphia's second-round pick
Philadelphia acquired two future second round selections}}</small>
|Creighton (Jr.)
|-
|style="text-align:center;"|2
|style="text-align:center;"|39
|
|SF
|
|Philadelphia 76ers (from New York, traded to the L.A. Lakers)
|Frankfurt Skyliners (Germany)
|-
|style="text-align:center;"|2
|style="text-align:center;"|40
|
|SF
|
|Brooklyn Nets (from L.A. Lakers via Orlando and Toronto)
|FC Barcelona Lassa (Spain)
|-
|style="text-align:center;"|2
|style="text-align:center;"|41
|
|SF
|
|Orlando Magic (from Charlotte via Memphis and Phoenix, traded to Denver)
|Kentucky (Fr.)
|-
|style="text-align:center;"|2
|style="text-align:center;"|42
|
|SG
|
|Detroit Pistons
|Miami (So.)
|-
|style="text-align:center;"|2
|style="text-align:center;"|43
!scope="row" style="background:#C0C0C0"|#
|SF
|
|Denver Nuggets (from L.A. Clippers via Philadelphia and New York, traded to Orlando)
|Maryland (So.)
|-
|style="text-align:center;"|2
|style="text-align:center;"|44
!scope="row" style="background:#C0C0C0"|#
|PG
|
|Washington Wizards
|Olimpija Ljubljana (Slovenia)
|-
|style="text-align:center;"|2
|style="text-align:center;"|45
|
|SG
|
|Brooklyn Nets (from Milwaukee, traded to Oklahoma City via Charlotte)
|Kentucky (Fr.)
|-
|style="text-align:center;"|2
|style="text-align:center;"|46
|
|SG
|
|Houston Rockets (from Miami via Memphis)
|USC (So.)
|-
|style="text-align:center;"|2
|style="text-align:center;"|47
|
|SG
|
|Los Angeles Lakers (from Denver via Utah and Chicago)
|Kansas (Sr.)
|-
|style="text-align:center;"|2
|style="text-align:center;"|48
|
|SF
|
|Minnesota Timberwolves
|Ohio State (Jr.)
|-
|style="text-align:center;"|2
|style="text-align:center;"|49
|
|PF
|
|San Antonio Spurs
|USC (Jr.)
|-
|style="text-align:center;"|2
|style="text-align:center;"|50
|
|PF
|
|Indiana Pacers
|Missouri State (Sr.)
|-
|style="text-align:center;"|2
|style="text-align:center;"|51
!scope="row" style="background:#C0C0C0"|#
|PG
|
|New Orleans Pelicans (from New Orleans via Miami, New Orleans and Chicago)
|Penn State (So.)
|-
|style="text-align:center;"|2
|style="text-align:center;"|52
|
|SF
|
|Utah Jazz (traded to Houston)
|Purdue (Sr.)
|-
|style="text-align:center;"|2
|style="text-align:center;"|53
|
|SG
|
|Oklahoma City Thunder
|Virginia (Sr.)
|-
|style="text-align:center;"|2
|style="text-align:center;"|54
|
|SG
|
|Dallas Mavericks (from Portland via Denver, traded to Philadelphia)
|SMU (Jr.)
|-
|style="text-align:center;"|2
|style="text-align:center;"|55
|
|SF
|
|Charlotte Hornets (from Cleveland via Philadelphia and Brooklyn)
|Orlandina Basket (Italy)
|-
|style="text-align:center;"|2
|style="text-align:center;"|56
|
|PF
|
|Philadelphia 76ers (traded to Dallas)
|Louisville (Jr.)
|-
|style="text-align:center;"|2
|style="text-align:center;"|57
|
|PF
|
|Oklahoma City Thunder (from Boston)
|Texas-Arlington (Sr.)
|-
|style="text-align:center;"|2
|style="text-align:center;"|58
|
|C
|
|Denver Nuggets (from Golden State)
|UCLA (Sr.)
|-
|style="text-align:center;"|2
|style="text-align:center;"|59
|
|SG
|
|Phoenix Suns (from Toronto)
|Colorado (Sr.)
|-
|style="text-align:center;"|2
|style="text-align:center;"|60
|
|SF/PF
|
|Philadelphia 76ers (from Houston, traded to Dallas)
|Dayton (Fr.)
|}

Notable undrafted players

These players were not selected in the 2018 NBA draft, but have played at least one game in the NBA.

Combine

The invitation-only NBA Draft Combine was held in Chicago from May 16 to 20. The on-court element of the combine took place on May 18 and 19. A total of 69 players were invited to the NBA Draft Combine, with two top talents in Deandre Ayton and Luka Dončić declining invitations for the event this year, with the latter player being involved with the 2018 EuroLeague Final Four at the time. Both mystery man Mitchell Robinson and Chandler Hutchison would remove themselves from the event at the last minute, although two other players would enter the event instead of them, leaving the proper number of official participants at 69. At the end of the draft deadline for international players, 12 players that entered the NBA Draft Combine that year ultimately withdrew from the NBA Draft, with 11 players returning to college and Brian Bowen planning on playing professionally before trying another NBA Draft instead.

Draft lottery

The NBA draft lottery took place during the playoffs on May 15, 2018. This year will be the last time it uses what was originally the updated system for the NBA draft lottery to upgrade draft odds for teams in the lower regions of the NBA. Starting in 2019 onward, the newer updated draft lottery will give the bottom 3 teams equal odds for the No. 1 pick, while some of the teams higher up the NBA draft would get an increased chance for a top-four pick instead of a top-three pick like in this year, thus hoping to discourage teams from potentially losing games on purpose for higher draft picks (and potentially better talent in the process). There were also two tiebreakers involved for lottery odds this season; the first involved the Dallas Mavericks having one more result favoring them having the No. 1 pick over the Atlanta Hawks after splitting the odds together, while the second tiebreaker had the Chicago Bulls splitting odds with the Sacramento Kings, resulting in the Bulls having slightly better odds on their end in the process. Funnily enough, both of the teams mentioned that lost the tiebreakers would wind up being in the Top 3 at the end of the NBA draft lottery. Furthermore, the Hawks would trade their Top 3 selection to Dallas for their selection in the draft instead.

Eligibility and entrants

The draft is conducted under the eligibility rules established in the league's 2017 collective bargaining agreement (CBA) with its player's union. The previous CBA that ended the 2011 lockout instituted no immediate changes to the draft but called for a committee of owners and players to discuss future changes.

All drafted players must be at least 19 years old during the calendar year of the draft. In terms of dates, players who are eligible for the 2018 draft must be born on or before December 31, 1999.
Since the 2016 draft, the following rules, as implemented by the NCAA Division I council for that division, are:
Declaration for the draft no longer results in automatic loss of college eligibility. As long as a player does not sign a contract with a professional team outside the NBA, or sign with an agent, he will retain college eligibility as long as he makes a timely withdrawal from the draft.
NCAA players have until 10 days after the end of the NBA Draft Combine to withdraw from the draft. Since the combine is held in mid-May, the current deadline is about five weeks after the previous mid-April deadline.
NCAA players may participate in the draft combine and are allowed to attend one tryout per year with each NBA team without losing college eligibility.
NCAA players may enter and withdraw from the draft up to two times without loss of eligibility. Previously, the NCAA treated the second declaration of draft eligibility as a permanent loss of college eligibility.

The NBA has since expanded the draft combine to include players with remaining college eligibility (who, like players without college eligibility, can only attend by invitation).

Early entrants
Players who are not automatically eligible have to declare their eligibility for the draft by notifying the NBA offices in writing no later than 60 days before the draft. For the 2018 draft, the date fell on April 22. After that date, "early entry" players can attend NBA pre-draft camps and individual team workouts to show off their skills and obtain feedback regarding their draft positions. Under the CBA a player may withdraw his name from consideration from the draft at any time before the final declaration date, which is 10 days before the draft. Under current NCAA rules, players had until May 30 (10 days after the draft combine) to withdraw from the draft and retain college eligibility.

A player who has hired an agent forfeits his remaining college eligibility regardless of whether he is drafted.

College underclassmen
A record-high 236 underclassed draft prospects (i.e., players with remaining college eligibility) had declared by the April 22 deadline, with 181 of these players being from college. The names listed here mean that they hired an agent, or had announced that they planned to do so before the night of the draft. At the end of the deadline, 77 players declared their intentions to enter the draft with an agent (with one player announcing his entry after the deadline) while 100 players announced their return to college for at least one more season. Meanwhile, Matur Maker, Brian Bowen, Micah Seaborn and Tavarius Shine did not enter the draft after letting their deadlines to retain college eligibility expire. These players instead decided to enter in 2019 via either the NBA G League or another professional league.

/ Deng Adel – F, Louisville (junior)
 Rawle Alkins – G, Arizona (sophomore)
 Mike Amius – F, Western Carolina (junior)
/ Kostas Antetokounmpo – F, Dayton (freshman)
 Deandre Ayton – C, Arizona (freshman)
 Marvin Bagley III – F/C, Duke (freshman)
 Mo Bamba – C, Texas (freshman)
 Keita Bates-Diop – F, Ohio State (junior)
 Tashawn Berry – G, Dakota College (sophomore)
 Leron Black – F, Illinois (junior)
 Jordan Brangers – G, South Plains College (sophomore)
 Mikal Bridges – F, Villanova (junior)
 Miles Bridges – F, Michigan State (sophomore)
 Bruce Brown Jr. – G, Miami (sophomore)
 Troy Brown Jr. – F, Oregon (freshman)
 Jalen Brunson – G, Villanova (junior)
 Elijah Bryant – G, BYU (junior)
 Tony Carr – G, Penn State (sophomore)
 Wendell Carter Jr. – F/C, Duke (freshman)
 Kameron Chatman – G/F, Detroit (junior)
 Bryant Crawford – G, Wake Forest (junior)
 Eric Davis – G, Texas (junior)
/ Tyler Davis – C, Texas A&M (junior)
 Marcus Derrickson – F, Georgetown (junior)
 Hamidou Diallo – G, Kentucky (freshman)
 Donte DiVincenzo – G, Villanova (sophomore)
 Dikembe Dixson – F, UIC (sophomore)
 Trevon Duval – G, Duke (freshman)
 Drew Eubanks – F, Oregon State (junior)
 Jacob Evans – G/F, Cincinnati (junior)
 Tremaine Fraiser – G, Westchester CC (sophomore)
 Melvin Frazier Jr. – G/F, Tulane (junior)
/ Wenyen Gabriel – F, Kentucky (sophomore)
 Kaiser Gates – F, Xavier (junior)
 Shai Gilgeous-Alexander – G, Kentucky (freshman)
 D. J. Hogg – F, Texas A&M (junior)
 Aaron Holiday – G, UCLA (junior)
 Kevin Huerter – G, Maryland (sophomore)
 DeAngelo Isby – G/F, Utah State (junior)
 Jaren Jackson Jr. – F, Michigan State (freshman)
 Justin Jackson – F/G, Maryland (sophomore)
 Ismaila Kane – F, Atlanta Metropolitan State College (freshman)
 Devonte Klines – G, Montana State (junior)
 Kevin Knox – F, Kentucky (freshman)
 Terry Larrier – F, Connecticut (junior)
 Marquez Letcher-Ellis – F, Nevada (sophomore)
 Makinde London – F, Chattanooga (junior)
 Brandon McCoy – C, UNLV (freshman)
 De'Anthony Melton – G, USC (sophomore)
 Chimezie Metu – F, USC (junior)
 Shake Milton – G, SMU (junior)
 Max Montana – F, San Diego State (junior)
 Doral Moore – C, Wake Forest (junior)
 Malik Newman – G, Kansas (sophomore)
/ Josh Okogie – G, Georgia Tech (sophomore)
 Ajdin Penava – F, Marshall (junior)
 Michael Porter Jr. – F, Missouri (freshman)
 Jerome Robinson – G, Boston College (junior)
 Mitchell Robinson – C, Western Kentucky (freshman)
 Brandon Sampson – G, LSU (junior)
 Corey Sanders – G, Rutgers (junior)
 Collin Sexton – G, Alabama (freshman)
 Landry Shamet – G, Wichita State (sophomore)
/ Yankuba Sima – F, Oklahoma State (junior)
 Anfernee Simons – G, IMG Academy (Postgraduate)
 Fred Sims – G, Chicago State (junior)
 Zhaire Smith – G/F, Texas Tech (freshman)
 Ray Spalding – F/C, Louisville (junior)
 Omari Spellman – F/C, Villanova (freshman)
 Khyri Thomas – G, Creighton (junior)
 Gary Trent Jr. – G, Duke (freshman)
 Allonzo Trier – G, Arizona (junior)
 Jarred Vanderbilt – F, Kentucky (freshman)
 Moritz Wagner – F, Michigan (junior)
 Lonnie Walker IV – G, Miami (freshman)
 Robert Williams III – F/C, Texas A&M (sophomore)
 Trae Young – G, Oklahoma (freshman)

International players
International players that had declared this year and did not previously declare in another prior year can drop out of the draft about 10 days before the draft begins on June 11. Initially, there were 55 players who originally expressed interest in entering the 2018 draft, one of which was a player who came directly out of high school from Canada. However, by the end of the deadline, 43 of those players (including the aforementioned Canadian high schooler) would ultimately pull their names out of the draft, leaving only 11 true international players entering the NBA Draft this year (the NBA link mentions LiAngelo Ball as an international player in the loosest sense of the word, but not Billy Preston there). Combining both the number of players listed previously and both LiAngelo Ball and Billy Preston as automatically eligible underclassmen under unique situations, the total number of underclassmen rounds out to 90 overall players.

 Isaac Bonga – G, Frankfurt Skyliners (Germany)
 Luka Dončić – G/F, Real Madrid (Spain)
 Tryggvi Hlinason – C, Valencia Basket (Spain)
 Michał Kolenda – F, Trefl Sopot (Poland)
 Arnoldas Kulboka – F, Betaland Capo d'Orlando (Italy)
 Rodions Kurucs – F, FC Barcelona Lassa (Spain)
 Džanan Musa – F, Cedevita Zagreb (Croatia)
 Williams Narace – SLUC Nancy Basket (France)
 Élie Okobo – G, Élan Béarnais Pau-Lacq-Orthez (France)
 Issuf Sanon – G, Olimpija Ljubljana (Slovenia)
 Filip Zagrajski – G, Vrijednosnice Osijek (Croatia)

Automatically eligible entrants
Players who do not meet the criteria for "international" players are automatically eligible if they meet any of the following criteria:
They have completed four years of their college eligibility.
If they graduated from high school in the U.S., but did not enroll in a U.S. college or university, four years have passed since their high school class graduated.
They have signed a contract with a professional basketball team not in the NBA, anywhere in the world, and have played under that contract.

Players who meet the criteria for "international" players are automatically eligible if they meet any of the following criteria:
They are at least 22 years old during the calendar year of the draft. In terms of dates, players born on or before December 31, 1996, are automatically eligible for the 2018 draft.
They have signed a contract with a professional basketball team not in the NBA within the United States'', and have played under that contract.

Trades involving draft picks

Pre-draft trades
Before the day of the draft, the following trades were made and resulted in exchanges of draft picks between the teams below.

Draft-day trades
Draft-day trades occurred on June 21, 2018, the day of the draft.

Invited attendees
The NBA annually invites around 15–20 players to sit in the so-called "green room", a special room set aside at the draft site for the invited players plus their families and agents. When their names are called, the player leaves the room and goes up on stage. Other players who are not invited are allowed to attend the ceremony. They sit in the stands with the fans and walk up on stage when (or if) they are drafted. On June 15, 2018, 19 total players were announced as invites for the NBA Draft that year (all of whom coming out of college this year), while potential top 3 pick Luka Dončić was initially not invited to the event due to the Liga ACB Finals potentially extending through the draft. On June 19, ESPN reported that Dončić would attend the draft, after all, following Real Madrid's championship victory the previous night, extending the list to 20 players. The following players (listed alphabetically) were confirmed as invites for the event this year:

 Deandre Ayton, Arizona
 Marvin Bagley III, Duke
 Mohamed Bamba, Texas
 Mikal Bridges, Villanova
 Miles Bridges, Michigan State
 Wendell Carter Jr., Duke
 Donte DiVincenzo, Villanova
 Luka Dončić, Real Madrid (Spain)
 Shai Gilgeous-Alexander, Kentucky
 Aaron Holiday, UCLA
 Chandler Hutchison, Boise State
 Jaren Jackson Jr., Michigan State
 Kevin Knox, Kentucky
 Michael Porter Jr., Missouri
 Jerome Robinson, Boston College
 Collin Sexton, Alabama
 Zhaire Smith, Texas Tech
 Lonnie Walker IV, Miami
 Robert Williams, Texas A&M
 Trae Young, Oklahoma

Notes

See also
 List of first overall NBA draft picks

References

External links

Official site

Draft
National Basketball Association draft
NBA Draft
2018 in sports in New York City
2010s in Brooklyn
Basketball in New York City
Sports in Brooklyn
Prospect Heights, Brooklyn
Sporting events in New York City
Events in Brooklyn, New York